Carmine Caridi (January 23, 1934 – May 28, 2019) was an American film, television and stage actor. He is best known for his roles in the films The Godfather Part II (1974) and The Godfather Part III (1990).

In 2004, Caridi became the first person to be expelled from the Academy of Motion Picture Arts and Sciences.

Life and career
Caridi's most notable film roles are Carmine Rosato in The Godfather Part II (1974) and Albert Volpe in The Godfather Part III (1990). He is one of three actors to play two different roles in the Godfather films; the others being Frank Sivero (who played a young Genco Abbandando in Godfather Part II and a bystander to the fight between Sonny Corleone and Carlo Rizzi in The Godfather), and Sofia Coppola (who played Mary Corleone in Godfather Part III and the infant son of Carlo and Connie baptized in the final scenes of The Godfather as well as a child on the ship at the beginning of Godfather Part II).

According to studio executive Robert Evans in his 1994 memoir The Kid Stays in the Picture, Caridi was director Francis Ford Coppola's first choice for the role of Sonny Corleone, but Evans insisted on James Caan because Caridi was too tall to play opposite Al Pacino. However, according to author Mark Seal in his 2022 book Leave the Gun, Take the Cannoli, Caan had been Coppola's choice from the start, who had major battles with Evans over this and other major casting decisions for The Godfather. In Mark Seal's account, Coppola attended theatre arts school with Caan and directed him, along with actor Robert Duvall, in the film The Rain People.

Caridi appeared in the cult movie Kiss Meets the Phantom of the Park (1978), playing amusement park manager Calvin Richards, and appeared as Sam Giancana in the 1992 film Ruby.

On television, he portrayed Dan Valenti on Phyllis from 1976-1977. In 1978, he appeared as Di Carlo in the episode "The Intimate Friends of Janet Wilde" of the series The Eddie Capra Mysteries. Between 1982 and 1983, Caridi played Angelo Martelli, Bruno Martelli's father, in the TV series Fame. Caridi played Detective Vince Gotelli in the television series NYPD Blue from 1993 to 1999.

Caridi's final appearance was a small role in the Season 10 episode of Curb Your Enthusiasm, "Insufficient Praise." Later on the season, Larry David's character is accused of allowing Caridi's Academy screener DVDs to be pirated.

Copyright infringement incident
On January 13, 2004, the Academy of Motion Picture Arts and Sciences announced that it had identified a copy of the film Something's Gotta Give, circulated illegally on the Internet, as carrying markings identifying it as coming from a VHS screener copy sent to Caridi because he was an Oscar voter. Similarly, unauthorized copies of The Last Samurai, Mystic River, Big Fish and Master and Commander: The Far Side of the World were said to have been traced to Caridi.

The FBI began an investigation into the affair and later that month charged Russell Sprague of Homewood, Illinois, with criminal copyright infringement. Federal authorities alleged that for at least three years, Caridi had given Sprague his screener copies of approximately 60 movies seeking consideration for the Academy Awards. According to the FBI affidavit, Caridi said that he sent his screeners via FedEx to Sprague, who gave him FedEx boxes, pre-addressed labels, and an account number. Caridi denied receiving money from Sprague, telling the FBI he believed that Sprague was a film buff.

Caridi and Sprague were sued by Sony and Time Warner on civil charges of copyright infringement. The studios filed the suit in the United States District Court for the Central District of California in Los Angeles, seeking damages of a minimum of $150,000 per movie, with hundreds of individual violations alleged. While awaiting trial on criminal charges, Sprague died of a suspected heart attack. Caridi was cleared of wrongdoing.

The Academy of Motion Picture Arts and Sciences announced on February 3, 2004, that it was expelling Caridi for violating his agreement to safeguard their screeners, making him the first Academy member to be expelled.

Death 
Caridi was hospitalized at Cedars-Sinai Medical Center in Los Angeles, where he slipped into a comatose state and died on May 28, 2019.

Filmography

References

External links 
 
 
 

1934 births
2019 deaths
Male actors from New York City
American male film actors
American male television actors
American people of Italian descent
20th-century American male actors
21st-century American male actors